The 2014 Toppserien is the twenty-eighth season of top-tier women's football in Norway since its establishment in 1987. A total of 12 teams are contesting the league, eleven returning from the 2013 season and the one teams promoted from the First Division, Grand Bodø.

The season started on 21 April 2014 and ended on 1 November 2014.

Teams

League table

Top goalscorers

References

External links
Toppserien - Norges Fotballforbund
Season on soccerway.com

Toppserien seasons
Top level Norwegian women's football league seasons
Norway
Norway
1